Maia de Carvalho Najla Jabor (25 September 1915 – 9 March 2001) was a Brazilian conductor and composer.

She composed concerti and symphonic works, but is best known for sacred songs. She was born and died in Rio de Janeiro, Brazil.

Works
Selected works include:

Suite de seis peças, no. 3. Um adeus (Text: Alda Pereira Pinto),  no. 5. A um poeta (Text: Alda Pereira Pinto), no. ?. Louco devaneio (Text: Alda Pereira Pinto)
A palavra de Deus (Text: Stela Dubois)
A semente é a dor amor (Text: Roque Martins)
A um poeta (in Suite de seis peças) (Text: Alda Pereira Pinto)
A um poeta - Loucos devaneios
Alucinação (Text: José Alfredo Maia de Carvalho)
Assim falou o poeta
Ave Maria  (Text: Bible or other Sacred Texts)
Balada n.1: Teus olhos (Text: Beni Carvalho)
Balada n.2 (Text: Ricardina Marques da Silva)
Barcarola, op. 92 (Text: Dylma Cunha de Oliveira)
Batuque n.1 (Text: Silvio Moreaux)
Batuque n.2 (Text: Raimundo de Brito)
Berceuse, op. 11
Canção bárbara (Text: Olga Mayer)
Canção de amor (Text: Iveta Ribeiro)
Canção do trovador (Text: José Alfredo Maia de Carvalho)
Canção dos olhos 
Canção simples (berceuse), op. 83 (Text: Nóbrega de Siqueira)
Copo de cristal (Text: Agrippino Grieco)
Desejo, op. 47 (Text: Iveta Ribeiro)
Gato preto (Text: Nóbrega de Siqueira)
Louco devaneio (in Suite de seis peças) (Text: Alda Pereira Pinto)
Noturno com palavras (Text: José Alfredo Maia de Carvalho)
Noturno n.3 - Rosa menina
Novo amor, op. 85 (Text: Aracy Rivera de Rezende)
O sonho (Text: J. Benedito Silveira Peixoto)
Oração à esperança (Text: Leopoldo Braga)
Pode entrar saudade (Text: E. Mangione, Jr.)
Romance, op. 11 (Text: Iveta Ribeiro)
Romance, op. 13 (Text: Iveta Ribeiro)
Romance, op. 56 (Text: Iveta Ribeiro)
Romance, op. 3 (Text: Sergio Murilo)
Romance, op. 6 (Text: José Jorge Guilherme de Araújo Jorge)
Sou assim
Toada n.1: brasileira (Text: Iveta Ribeiro)
Toada n.2: morena (Text: Carlos Paula Barros)
Toada n.3: Não sei viver sem ti (Text: Diva Jabor)
Toada n.5: Quando o amor vem(Text: Antônio Siqueira)
Toda n.4: Amor (Text: Carlos Paula Barros)
Um adeus (in Suite de seis peças) (Text: Alda Pereira Pinto)
Único amor (berceuse), op. 65 (Text: Elora Possolo)

References

1915 births
2001 deaths
20th-century classical composers
Brazilian classical composers
Women classical composers
Brazilian music educators
Musicians from Rio de Janeiro (city)
Women music educators
20th-century women composers